William Shatner  (born March 22, 1931) is a Canadian actor. In a career spanning seven decades, he is best known for his portrayal of James T. Kirk in the Star Trek franchise, from his 1966 debut as the captain of the starship Enterprise in the second pilot of the first Star Trek television series to his final appearance as Captain Kirk in the seventh Star Trek feature film, Star Trek Generations (1994).

Shatner began his screen acting career in Canadian films and television productions before moving into guest-starring roles in various U.S. television shows. He appeared as James Kirk in all the episodes of Star Trek: The Original Series, 21 of the 22 episodes of Star Trek: The Animated Series, and the first seven Star Trek movies. He has written a series of books chronicling his experiences before, during and after his time in a Starfleet uniform. He has also co-written several novels set in the Star Trek universe and a series of science fiction novels, the TekWar sequence, that were adapted for television. Outside Star Trek, Shatner played the eponymous veteran police sergeant in T. J. Hooker (1982–1986) and hosted the reality-based television series Rescue 911 (1989–1996), which won a People's Choice Award for Favorite New TV Dramatic Series. His appearances as a guest star in two episodes of the television detective series Columbo, almost two decades apart, were among his many such contributions to television shows from the 1970s to the 2010s.

Shatner's television career after his last appearance as Captain Kirk has embraced comedy, drama and reality shows. In seasons 4 and 5 of the NBC series 3rd Rock from the Sun, he played the alien "Big Giant Head" to which the main characters reported. From 2004 until 2008, he starred as attorney Denny Crane in the final season of the legal show The Practice and in its spinoff Boston Legal, a role that earned him two Emmy Awards, one for his contribution to each series. In 2016, 2017 and 2018, he starred in both seasons of NBC's Better Late Than Never, a comical travel series in which a band of elderly celebrities toured east Asia and Europe.

Aside from acting, Shatner has had a career as a recording artist, beginning in 1968 with his album The Transformed Man. His cover versions of songs are dramatic recitations of their lyrics rather than musical performances: the most notable are his versions of the Beatles' "Lucy in the Sky with Diamonds", Bob Dylan's "Mr. Tambourine Man", and Elton John's "Rocket Man". His most successful album was his third, Seeking Major Tom (2011), which includes covers of Pink Floyd's "Learning to Fly", David Bowie's "Space Oddity" and Queen's "Bohemian Rhapsody".

In 2021, Shatner flew into space aboard a Blue Origin sub-orbital capsule. At age 90, he became the oldest person to fly in space and one of the first 600 to do so. Minutes after the flight, he described experiencing the overview effect.

Early life 
Shatner was born on March 22, 1931, in the Notre-Dame-de-Grâce neighbourhood of Montreal, Quebec, Canada, to a Conservative Jewish household. His parents were Ann (née Garmaise) and Joseph Shatner, a clothing manufacturer. He is the middle child of three siblings: he has an older sister, Joy Rutenberg (1928–) and a younger sister, Farla Cohen (1940–). His patrilineal family name was Schattner—it was his grandfather, Wolf Schattner, who anglicized it. All four of Shatner's grandparents were Jewish immigrants: they came from settlements that are currently in Ukraine and Lithuania, but which were then under the rule of Austria-Hungary and the Russian Empire.

Shatner attended two schools in Notre-Dame-de-Grâce, Willingdon Elementary School and West Hill High School, and is an alumnus of the Montreal Children's Theatre. He studied Economics at the McGill University Faculty of Management in Montreal, where he graduated with a Bachelor of Commerce degree in 1952. In 2011, McGill University awarded him an honorary Doctorate of Letters. He was granted the same accolade by the New England Institute of Technology in May 2018.

Acting and literary career

1951–1966: Early stage, film, and television work
Shatner's movie career began while he was still at college. In 1951, he had a small role in a Canadian comedy drama, The Butler's Night Off: its credits list him as Bill Shatner, and describe his role simply as "a crook". After graduating, he worked as an assistant manager and actor at both the Mountain Playhouse in Montreal and the Canadian National Repertory Theatre in Ottawa before joining the Stratford Shakespeare Festival in Ontario. His roles at the Festival included a part in Marlowe's Tamburlaine, in which he made his Broadway debut in 1956. His brief appearance in the opening scene of a high profile production of Sophocles's Oedipus Rex by Tyrone Guthrie introduced him to television viewers across the whole of Canada. In Henry V, he combined playing the minor role of the Duke of Gloucester with understudying Christopher Plummer as the king: when a kidney stone obliged Plummer to withdraw from a performance, Shatner's decision to present a distinctive interpretation of his role rather than imitating his senior's impressed Plummer as a striking manifestation of initiative and potential. (Plummer later appeared as a Klingon adversary of Captain Kirk's in Star Trek VI: The Undiscovered Country.) Guthrie too rated the young Shatner very highly, later recalling him as the most promising actor that his Festival employed, and for a time, he was seen as a potential peer of Steve McQueen, Paul Newman and Robert Redford. In the view of Pat Jordan, author of an in-depth profile of Shatner for The New York Times, his subsequent failure to achieve the acclaim accorded to his starrier contemporaries was attributable to his professional philosophy of "work equals work", and his consequent participation in many "forgettable" projects that probably did his career more harm than good. On the eve of his momentous casting as James Kirk, he was in Jordan's opinion seen merely as an actor who "showed up on time, knew his lines, worked cheap and always answered his phone".

In 1954, Shatner decided to leave Stratford and move to New York City in the hope of building a career on the Broadway stage. He was soon offered the chance to make his first appearance on American television: in a children's program called The Howdy Doody Show, he created the role of Ranger Bob, co-starring with a cast of puppets and Clarabell the Clown, whose dialogue with Shatner consisted entirely of honks on a bicycle horn. It was four years before he won his first role in a major Hollywood movie, appearing in the MGM film The Brothers Karamazov as Alexei, the youngest of the brothers, in a cast that included Yul Brynner. In December 1958, directed by Kirk Browning, he appeared opposite Ralph Bellamy as a Roman tax collector in Bethlehem on the day of Jesus's birth in a Hallmark Hall of Fame live television production entitled The Christmas Tree, the cast list of which included Jessica Tandy, Margaret Hamilton, Bernadette Peters, Richard Thomas, Cyril Ritchard, and Carol Channing. His US television profile was heightened further when he had a leading role in an episode in the third (1957–58) season of Alfred Hitchcock Presents, "The Glass Eye".

In 1959, Shatner received good reviews in the role of Lomax in The World of Suzie Wong on Broadway. In the March of that year, while still performing in that production, he also played detective Archie Goodwin in what would have been television's first Nero Wolfe series, had it not been aborted by CBS after shooting a pilot and a few episodes.

Shatner appeared in two episodes of The Twilight Zone, "Nick of Time" (1960) and "Nightmare at 20,000 Feet" (1963); when a Twilight Zone portmanteau film was produced twenty years later, it was with a remake of the latter episode that the movie climaxed. He appeared twice as Wayne Gorham in NBC's Outlaws (1960), a Western series with Barton MacLane, and then returned to Alfred Hitchcock Presents for a 5th-season episode, "Mother, May I Go Out to Swim?". In 1961, co-starring with Julie Harris, he appeared on Broadway in A Shot in the Dark, directed by Harold Clurman; Gene Saks and Walter Matthau took part in the play too, Matthau winning a Tony Award for his performance. Shatner was featured in two episodes of the NBC television series Thriller ("The Grim Reaper" and "The Hungry Glass") and the film The Explosive Generation (1961). He took the lead role in Roger Corman's movie The Intruder (1962) and received very good reviews for his significant role in the Stanley Kramer film Judgment at Nuremberg (1961). In the 1963–64 season, he appeared in an episode of the ABC series Channing. In 1963, he starred in the Family Theater production called "The Soldier" and received credits in other programs of The Psalms series. That same year, he guest-starred in Route 66, in the episode "Build Your Houses with Their Backs to the Sea".

In 1964, Shatner guest-starred in the second episode of the second season of the ABC science fiction anthology series The Outer Limits, "Cold Hands, Warm Heart". Also that year, he appeared in an episode of the CBS drama The Reporter, "He Stuck in His Thumb", and played a supporting role in the Western feature film The Outrage, a remake of Akira Kurosawa's Rashomon starring Paul Newman, Laurence Harvey, Claire Bloom and Edward G. Robinson. 1964 also saw Shatner cast in an episode of The Man from U.N.C.L.E. that featured Leonard Nimoy, later to be his co-star in Star Trek. 1964 saw him too as the titular Alexander in the pilot for a proposed series called Alexander the Great alongside Adam West as Cleander. The series was not picked up, and the pilot remained unaired until 1968, when it was repackaged as a TV movie to capitalize on the fame that West and Shatner had won in the interim. Shatner hoped that the series would be a major success, but West was apparently unsurprised by its failure to proceed, later castigating the pilot for "one of the worst scripts I have ever read" and recalling it as "one of the worst things I've ever done."

In 1965, Shatner guest-starred in 12 O'Clock High as Major Curt Brown in the episode "I Am the Enemy". In the same year, he had the lead role in a legal drama, For the People, starring as an assistant district attorney married to a woman played by Jessica Walter; ironically, it was only the show's cancellation after its 13-episode first season that allowed him to walk onto the bridge of the Enterprise the following year. Shatner starred in the 1966 gothic horror film Incubus (Esperanto: Inkubo,) the second feature-length movie ever made with all dialogue spoken in Esperanto. He also starred in an episode of Gunsmoke in 1966 as the character Fred Bateman. He appeared as attorney-turned-counterfeiter Brett Skyler in a 1966 episode of The Big Valley, "Time to Kill". In 1967, he starred in the little known Spaghetti Western White Comanche, playing both a white-hat character and his black-hat evil twin: Johnny Moon, a virtuous half-Comanche gunslinger, and Notah, a bloodthirsty warlord.

1966–1969: Star Trek on television

Shatner was cast as Captain James T. Kirk for the second pilot of Star Trek, titled "Where No Man Has Gone Before". He was then contracted to play Kirk for the remainder of the show, and he sat in the captain's chair of the USS Enterprise from 1966 to 1969. During its original run on NBC, the series achieved only modest ratings, and it was cancelled after three seasons and seventy-nine episodes. Plato's Stepchildren, aired on November 22, 1968, earned Shatner a footnote in the history of American race relations: a kiss that Captain Kirk planted on the lips of Lieutenant Uhura (Nichelle Nichols) is often cited as the first example of a white man kissing a black woman on scripted television in the United States. In 1973, Shatner returned to the role of Kirk, albeit only in voice, in the animated Star Trek series, which ran for two seasons and twenty-two episodes.

1970–1978: overcoming typecasting
In the early 1970s, in the immediate aftermath of the cancellation of Star Trek in 1969, Shatner experienced difficulty in finding employment, having become somewhat typecast as James Tiberius Kirk. With very little money and few acting prospects, he lost his home and was for a time so poor that he was reduced to living in a truck-bed camper in the San Fernando Valley. He refers to this part of his life as "that period", a humbling time during which he would take any odd job, including small party appearances, in order to support his family.

Shatner's film work in this phase of his career was limited to such B-movies as Roger Corman's Big Bad Mama (1974), the horror film The Devil's Rain (1975) and Kingdom of the Spiders (1977). On television, he made a critically praised appearance as a prosecutor in a 1971 PBS adaptation of Saul Levitt's play The Andersonville Trial, and was also seen in major parts in the movies The People (1972) and The Horror at 37,000 Feet (1973). He had a starring role too in the western-themed secret agent series Barbary Coast during 1975 and 1976, and appeared as a guest of the week in many popular shows of that decade, including Columbo, Ironside, Kung Fu, Mission: Impossible, The Rookies and The Six Million Dollar Man. One of the special skills that Shatner was able to offer to casting directors was an expertise in a martial art: he was taught American Kenpo karate by the black belt Tom Bleecker, who had in turn been trained by the founder of American Kenpo, Ed Parker.

To supplement his income from acting, Shatner performed as a celebrity guest in a multitude of television game shows, among them Beat the Clock, Celebrity Bowling, The Hollywood Squares, Match Game, Tattletales and Mike Stokey's Stump the Stars. His curriculum vitae in this genre included several visits to The $10,000 Pyramid and its more generous sequels, shows in which contestants attempted to guess a word or phrase with the help of hints from a famous partner. Shatner's contributions to the Pyramid series included a week-long match-up that pitted him against Leonard Nimoy in an event billed as "Kirk versus Spock". In a 1977 episode, he perpetrated a blunder that has been preserved on YouTube: at the climax of the show, attempting to guide his partner to the phrase "things that are blessed", he blurted out the word "blessed" instead of, as he had intended, citing the Virgin Mary. His mistake meant that the contestant paired with him was automatically disqualified from receiving what would have been a prize of $20,000. Shatner was so furious at himself over his error that he leapt out of his chair, picked it up and threw it out of the show's iconic Winner's Circle. During an Archive of American Television interview, Richard Dawson disclosed that when Mark Goodson was considering whom to employ as the host of the pilot of Family Feud (1976), he would have chosen Shatner if had not been intimidated into awarding the position to Dawson by a threat from Dawson's agent.

Advertising agencies also played a part in helping Shatner through his post-Kirk doldrums. Among the television commercials for which he was hired were spots promoting General Motors' Oldsmobile brand, Promise margerine, the British Columbia-based supermarket chain SuperValu and its Ontarian equivalent, Loblaws; Canadian viewers became familiar with the former hero of Starfleet reassuring them that "At Loblaws, more than the price is right. But, by gosh, the price is right."

1979–1989: Star Trek movies and T. J. Hooker
After Star Trek was cancelled, it acquired a cult following among people watching syndicated reruns of the series, and Captain Kirk became a cultural icon. Fans of the show—so-called Trekkies—began organizing conventions where they could meet like-minded enthusiasts, buy Star Trek merchandise and enjoy question and answer sessions with members of the show's regular cast. Many of the actors who had crewed the Enterprise became frequent guests at these events, Shatner included.

In the mid-1970s, noting the growing appetite for Star Trek, Paramount began pre-producing a sequel show, Star Trek: Phase II, in which they planned to present new, younger actors alongside the stars of the original series. However, astounded by the enormous success that George Lucas's film Star Wars achieved in 1977, the studio decided that Star Trek would earn them more money if the next adventure of the Enterprise took place not on television but in theatres. Shatner and all the other original Star Trek cast members returned to their roles when Paramount produced Star Trek: The Motion Picture, released in 1979. He went on to play Kirk in six further Star Trek films: Star Trek II: The Wrath of Khan (1982), Star Trek III: The Search for Spock (1984), Star Trek IV: The Voyage Home (1986), Star Trek V: The Final Frontier (1989), Star Trek VI: The Undiscovered Country (1991) and—in a story that culminated in the captain's self-sacrificial death—Star Trek Generations (1994). His final appearances as James Tiberius were in the movie sequences of the video game Starfleet Academy (1997), in a 2006 DirecTV advertisement that used footage from Star Trek VI: The Undiscovered Country and at the 2013 Academy Awards, in which he reprised the role for a comedic interlude with the show's host, Seth MacFarlane.

Although the resurrection of Star Trek from oblivion only came about because of the enthusiasm of Trekkies, Shatner's attitude towards them is not uncritical. In a much-discussed 1986 Saturday Night Live sketch about a Star Trek convention, he advised a room full of Trekkies to "get a life". The comment was an apt summary of the view of his fans that he had expressed in several interviews. Their adoration of him took unwelcome forms almost from the beginning of his time as Captain Kirk; as early as April 1968, a group of them attempted to tear his clothes from him as he left 30 Rockefeller Plaza. His amusement at the behaviour of the lunatic fringe of his admirers was reflected in the romantic comedy movie Free Enterprise (1998), in which he contributed a caricature of himself to a film that satirized some Trekkies' Kirk idolatry. He also mocked the cavalier, almost superhuman, persona of Captain Kirk in the films Airplane II: The Sequel (1982) and National Lampoon's Loaded Weapon 1 (1993).

In 1982, Shatner was once again the leading character of a high-profile television show when he was cast as a veteran Los Angeles police sergeant in T. J. Hooker. Running for five seasons and ninety-one episodes until 1986, the series partnered Shatner with Heather Locklear and James Darren, later to be a recurring cast member of the third live-action Star Trek show, Deep Space Nine. The success of T. J. Hooker led to Shatner's hosting the popular dramatic re-enactment series Rescue 911 from 1989 to 1996. His career diversified further in the 1980s when he began working as a director, taking charge of many episodes of T. J. Hooker. A clause in his Star Trek contract giving him parity with Leonard Nimoy meant that after Nimoy's directing of Star Trek IV: The Voyage Home, Shatner was entitled to direct a Star Trek movie too: he exercised his right in Star Trek V: The Final Frontier, although many Trekkies were disappointed by the film that he delivered, something that he attributed principally to the weakness of the movie's visual effects. His growing success on television and in movie theatres in the 1980s did not lead him to stop working for advertisers. The VIC-20 home computer, for example, was endorsed by him both on television and in print.

On May 19, 1983, the iconic status of Captain Kirk was acknowledged with a ceremony celebrating Shatner's being awarded the 1,762nd star on the Hollywood Walk of Fame. Shatner also has a star on Canada's Walk of Fame, granted to him in recognition of his being the first Canadian actor to star in major series on three U.S. networks—NBC, CBS and ABC.

1989–1999: TekWar and other diversifications
Working on T. J. Hooker inspired Shatner with the idea of developing a television show in which he would play a character that would be a hybrid of Hooker and Kirk—a hard-boiled former police officer working as a private investigator in a dystopian future. When the production of Star Trek V was delayed by a Writer's Guild strike, Shatner began transforming his initial concept into a novel, assisted by an established author of pulp science fiction, Ron Goulart. Goulart described his contribution to Shatner's endeavour as merely that of an adviser, but Shatner credits him with rewriting. The first fruit of their collaboration, TekWar, was published in 1989, and launched a sequence of books that sold hundreds of thousands of copies. The novels led to four TekWar television movies, in which Shatner played not the lead character but his boss, Walter Bascom. Shatner reprised the role in a television series that followed, as well as directing several episodes of it himself, but its run on the USA Network, Syfy and Canada's CTV was brief.

In December 1989, Shatner took part in the British television series This Is Your Life, a show in which a celebrity is ambushed by the host and then taken to a studio for the story of his life to be told in a stream of anecdotes related by his acquaintances: Shatner's episode began with Michael Aspel taking him by surprise on the set of the Starship Enterprise at Universal Studios in Hollywood. In 1994, Shatner revisited Columbo to play the murderer-of-the-week in the episode Butterfly in shades of grey. In 1995, he narrated Peter Kuran's documentary film Trinity and Beyond: The Atomic Bomb Movie, and his TekWar franchise expanded into the world of computer games with a first-person shooter release, William Shatner's TekWar. In 1996, an episode entitled Eye, Tooth saw him guest-starring in Will Smith's television show, The Fresh Prince of Bel-Air. He narrated a television miniseries shot in New Zealand A Twist in the Tale (1998). In the television series 3rd Rock from the Sun, Shatner appeared in several 1999–2000 episodes as the "Big Giant Head", a high-ranking officer from the same alien planet as the Solomon family who becomes a womanizing party-animal on Earth. The role earned Shatner an Emmy Award nomination.

In the late 1990s, Shatner became closely accociated with the travel website priceline.com, appearing in many television commercials for the company as a pompous caricature of himself. He has said that while it is true that his work for priceline earned him stock options, reports that they are now worth hundreds of millions of dollars are exaggerated. He was also the Chief Executive Officer of the Toronto, Ontario-based C.O.R.E. Digital Pictures, a special effects studio that operated from 1994 to 2010.

In May 1999, Simon & Schuster published Shatner's book Get a Life!, a memoir of his experiences with Trekkies. As well as anecdotes about Star Trek conventions, the book features interviews with some of the most devoted fans of the Star Trek franchise, including conversations with several Trekkies who regard the show not just as entertainment but as philosophically significant.

2000–2009: Further films, and Denny Crane
In the Sandra Bullock comedy movie Miss Congeniality (2000), Shatner played the supporting role of Stan Fields, the co-host of the Miss United States Pageant; his future Boston Legal co-star Candice Bergen took part in the film too. Shatner also appeared in Miss Congeniality 2: Armed and Fabulous (2004), in which Stan Fields is kidnapped in Las Vegas together with the winner of the pageant of the previous year. (Life imitated art in Gary, Indiana in 2001, when Shatner visited the town to host the Miss USA Pageant for real). In Osmosis Jones (2001), a high-concept satirical movie that blended live action with animation, Shatner voiced Mayor Phlegmming; the film depicted the cells and microbiota of a human body as the citizens of a community, the city of Frank, governed by an egoistic politician who prioritizes his convenience and political self-interest over the welfare of his public. In Groom Lake, released the following year, Shatner repeated his Star Trek V feat of directing and starring in a movie based on a story of his own invention—a film exploiting the interest in Area 51 kindled by The X-Files, and co-starring a young Amy Acker, later best known as a regular colleague of Joss Whedon. In 2003, Shatner appeared in Brad Paisley's Celebrity and Online music videos along with Little Jimmy Dickens, Jason Alexander and Trista Rehn. He also had a supporting role in the comedy DodgeBall: A True Underdog Story (2004), which starred Ben Stiller and Vince Vaughn. In the October 2004 issue of Star Trek Communicator, Manny Coto, one of the producers of Star Trek: Enterprise, revealed that he was planning a three-episode story arc guest-starring Shatner, but the cancellation of the series shortly afterwards meant that Shatner was denied the opportunity to take part in it.

After David E. Kelley saw Shatner's commercials, he brought Shatner on to the final season of the legal drama The Practice. According to Pat Jordan, Shatner's Emmy Award-winning role, the eccentric but highly capable attorney Denny Crane, was essentially "William Shatner the man ... playing William Shatner the character playing the character Denny Crane, who was playing the character William Shatner." Shatner took the Crane role to Boston Legal and won a Golden Globe and an Emmy in 2005, and was Emmy nominated again in 2006, 2007, 2008 and 2009. With his 2005 Emmy accolade, he became one of the few actors (along with co-star James Spader as Alan Shore) to win an Emmy Award while playing the same character in two different shows. Shatner remained with Boston Legal until, after five seasons and one hundred and one episodes, it ended in 2008.

Two high-profile animated pictures released in 2006 featured Shatner in their cast. In DreamWorks' Over the Hedge, he voiced Ozzie, an opossum; in Walt Disney's The Wild, he had the role of the movie's villain, Kazar, a megalomaniacal wildebeest.  In January 2007, he began posting daily autobiographical vlogs on the LiveVideo platform in a project that he named ShatnerVision; rebranded as The Shatner Project, his vlogging migrated to YouTube the following year. In December 2008, he experimented with the chat show genre in the humorous Shatner's Raw Nerve, which aired until March 2011. He expanded his work on YouTube in 2009, supplying the voice of Don Salmonella to the animated series The Gavones.

Shatner made several guest appearances on The Tonight Show with Conan O'Brien, including in cameos in which he made fun of the Republican politician Sarah Palin. He opened mock-hostilities on July 27, 2009, with a poetry slam inspired recitation of the speech in which she had resigned the governorship of Alaska. Two days later, he ridiculed some of the tweets that she and Levi Johnston, the father of her grandchild, had published on Twitter. On December 11, 2009, he returned to Palin once more to read excerpts from her autobiography, Going Rogue: An American Life, and she, taking his teasing in good part, responded by reciting extracts from his own memoir, Up Till Now. (Co-written with David Fisher, later to collaborate with Shatner on a book about Leonard Nimoy and Shatner's relationship with him, Up Till Now had been published in 2008.) Shatner also contributed to O'Brien's recurring "In the Year 3000" feature, which began with Shatner's disembodied head floating in space and delivering the segment's portentous tag line: "And so we take a cosmic ride into that new millennium; that far off reality that is the year 3000. It's the future, man".

Shatner was not "offered or suggested" a role in the 2009 film Star Trek. Director J. J. Abrams said in July 2007 that the production was "desperately trying to figure out a way to put him in" but that to "shove him in ... would be a disaster", an opinion echoed by Shatner in several interviews. At a convention held in 2010, Shatner described the film as "wonderful". Two years before its release, his own tale of how the characters of the original series of Star Trek might have come together was published in his novel Star Trek: Academy – Collision Course.

2010–present: a miscellany of projects
In April 2010, Shatner began hosting the Discovery Channel show Weird or What, which aired until August 2012. Each episode of the series supplied lovers of arcana with several segments exploring news reports relating to left-field topics such as UFOs and cryptozoology.   
Later that year, his career as a comic television actor reached its zenith in a CBS sitcom based on Justin Halpern's Twitter feed Shit My Dad Says, $#*! My Dad Says, which was cancelled in May 2011 three months after the first broadcast of its final episode. 2011 also saw him guest-starring in one episode of the USA Network's Psych, "In for a Penny", playing the estranged father of Junior Detective Juliet O'Hara (Maggie Lawson) (a role that he reprised in the show's 2012 season). For Trekkies, his most notable project of the year was the first Star Trek film that he had directed since Star Trek V. The Captains, which he also wrote and presented, was a feature-length documentary in which he interviewed all five of the actors who had played the principal role in the Star Trek sequels that had been created up to that point—Patrick Stewart of Star Trek: The Next Generation, Avery Brooks of Star Trek: Deep Space Nine, Kate Mulgrew of Star Trek: Voyager, Scott Bakula of Star Trek: Enterprise and Chris Pine of J. J. Abrams's 2009 movie. The film also included a conversation between Shatner and his Star Trek VI co-star Christopher Plummer, a sequence celebrating a friendship that began when the two actors both took part in the Stratford Shakespeare Festival and reflecting Shatner's profound admiration for his colleague.

Shatner's 2012 began with his return to his roots in theatre. In February, he appeared on Broadway in a one-man show called Shatner's World: We Just Live in It. After a three-week run at the Music Box, the show toured throughout the United States. In May, he was the guest presenter on the British satirical television quiz show Have I Got News for You, earning a footnote in the history of neologisms by melding "pioneer" and "pensioner" into the portmanteau coinage "pensioneer". On July 28, he appeared on the premium cable TV channel Epix as the star of Get a Life!, a documentary film about Star Trek fandom developed from the 1999 book about Trekkies that he had written in the aftermath of his Saturday Night Live rebuke to them. On September 25, he revisited the music video genre, appearing as a home plate umpire in the crooner Brian Evans's baseball-themed "At Fenway".

On April 24, 2014, Shatner performed an autobiographical one-man show on Broadway, which was filmed for subsequent screening in more than 700 theatres across Australia, Canada and the United States. A large portion of the revenue of the project went to charity. In 2015, he played Mark Twain in an episode of the Canadian historical crime drama series Murdoch Mysteries, and Croatoan – the dangerous, interdimensional father of Audrey Parker – in the last episodes of the fifth and final season of SyFy channel's fantasy series Haven. In the August of that year, Trekkies were treated to a sequel to The Captains which he produced, scripted and directed and in which he starred: William Shatner Presents: Chaos on the Bridge, a behind-the-scenes documentary film about Star Trek: The Next Generation.

Premiering on August 23, 2016, the NBC reality miniseries Better Late Than Never followed Shatner and a quartet of other aging celebrities—Terry Bradshaw, Jeff Dye, George Foreman and Henry Winkler—as they took a grand tour around Japan, South Korea and Southeast Asia. Shatner joked that Bradshaw, famous as a quarterback with the Pittsburgh Steelers, was "putty in my hands". Another new enterprise that he launched that year was Shatner Singularity, a publisher of comic-books, which has a list including the graphic novel Stan Lee's 'God Woke by Lee and Mariano and Fabian Nicieza. The book won the 2017 Independent Publisher Book Awards' Outstanding Books of the Year Independent Voice Award.

Shatner's most notable television work in 2017 was in the second season of Better Late Than Never: a preview episode of December 11, 2017, was followed by an official season premiere on the New Year's Day of 2018. His equestrian enthusiasm found an outlet in the animated children's show My Little Pony: Friendship is Magic, where in the seventh season episode "The Perfect Pear", he supplied the voice of Grand Pear, the estranged maternal grandfather of Applejack and her siblings. He announced his participation in the series in a Twitter post quoting one of its catchphrases, and disclosed that he was himself a so-called brony, one of the show's devotees. 2017 also saw him appearing in a second music video with Brian Evans, this time promoting Evans's cover of the Dolly Parton song "Here You Come Again".

Shatner became the focus of political controversy in 2021, when it was revealed that a popular science documentary show that he would host, I Don't Understand with William Shatner, was scheduled to be aired on RT, formerly known as Russia Today, from July 12. RT's editor-in-chief, Margarita Simonyan, said that "Captain Kirk has come over to the good side." Criticized by a Russian journalist for his involvement with the government-controlled outlet, Shatner branded his accuser a hypocrite and compared his contract with RT to the arrangement through which the channel had acquired the right to broadcast American football games. Four days after the Russian invasion of Ukraine on February 24, 2022, Shatner issued a statement via Twitter expressing unqualified support for the Ukrainians in the resistance that they were mounting against their assailants. On March 2, he withdrew from his show, citing the invasion as his reason for doing so. RT America ceased transmitting altogether on March 3.

Also in 2021, Shatner starred in the film Senior Moment, which co-starred Jean Smart and Christopher Lloyd. The movie was released in March 2021 on the same week Shatner turned 90.

In 2022, Shatner competed in season eight of The Masked Singer as "Knight" (depicted as a knight riding a golden goose). A running gag is that the golden goose that "Knight" rides keeps trying to attack Nick Cannon. He was eliminated in the first episode alongside Eric Idle as "Hedgehog" and Chris Kirkpatrick as "Hummingbird".

Shatner hosted and executive produced The UnXplained on History from 2019 to 2022.

Career as a recording artist

The Transformed Man and other albums 
Shatner made his debut on the shelves of record shops in 1968, with the release of an album titled The Transformed Man. It offered readings from classic plays followed by dramatically inflected recitations of the texts of thematically related popular songs, both set against a background of instrumental accompaniment. Among the hits that the LP subjected to Shatnerfication were Bob Dylan's "Mr Tambourine Man" and the Lennon–McCartney song "Lucy in the Sky with Diamonds". The idiosyncratic way with songs that Shatner chose for this LP, an approach so amusical that it scarcely even qualified as Sprechstimme, was a style to which he remained loyal throughout his recording career.

In 1977, a performance that Shatner had given during a tour in 1971 was released on a Lemli Records double album, William Shatner Live. The LPs' bill of fare included him reminiscing about his work on Star Trek and reading excerpts from Edmond Rostand's Cyrano de Bergerac, H. G. Wells's The War of the Worlds and Bertolt Brecht's Galileo. A year later, the recording was reissued by another company, again as a double LP, now titled William Shatner Live: Captain of the Starship. Devoid of Star Trek branding because of licensing restrictions, the album's sleeve was decorated with a photograph of Shatner brandishing an upturned camera tripod in the style of Jim Kirk going into battle with a phaser rifle.

Shatner's second studio album did not materialize until a third of a century after his first: Has Been was released in October 2004. Produced by Ben Folds, it included a number of songs co-written with Folds and arranged by him, as well as a cover of the Pulp hit "Common People" performed with Joe Jackson. Seeking Major Tom followed in October 2011. Initially announced by Shatner under that title on February 4, it was later promoted by him as Searching for Major Tom before reverting to the name that he had given it originally. Shatner's colleagues on the project included popular musicians of considerable notability: the country star Brad Paisley, Zakk Wylde of Black Label Society, Peter Frampton, Brian May of Queen, Steve Howe from Yes, John Wetton from King Crimson and Asia, Ritchie Blackmore from Deep Purple, Alan Parsons and Bootsy Collins of Parliament-Funkadelic. Astronautically themed and with a general flavour of heavy metal, the album featured covers of Pink Floyd's "Learning to Fly", David Bowie's "Space Oddity" and Queen's "Bohemian Rhapsody".

Shatner's fifteen-track album Ponder the Mystery, produced by Billy Sherwood, was issued in October 2013. Among the musicians who contributed to it were Mick Jones, Simon House, Steve Vai, Al Di Meola, Steve Howe's Yes colleague Rick Wakeman, Joel Vandroogenbroeck, Edgar Winter, Nik Turner, Vince Gill, Edgar Froese, Robby Krieger, Dav Koz, George Duke and Zoot Horn Rollo. The record's credits attributed all its music to Sherwood and all its song texts to Shatner. Shatner's first venture into the country music genre, Why Not Me, appeared in August 2018, with a new partner in the form of Jeff Cook, best known as a founding member of the American band Alabama. Released on the Heartland Records Nashville label, this album also included guest vocals by Neal McCoy, Home Free and Cash Creek. A holiday collection, Shatner Claus, appeared in October 2018, with Shatner now aided and abetted by Iggy Pop, Henry Rollins, Todd Rundgren, Billy Gibbons and others. Shatner's ninth album, The Blues, was released on October 2, 2020, and reached the number one slot of the Billboard Blues Chart fifteen days later. A tenth album, Bill, was announced by Shatner on August 26, 2021, and released on September 24.

As well as recording his own series of discs, Shatner has taken part in other artists' releases too. Ben Folds's 1998 album Fear of Pop: Volume 1 features Shatner on two tracks, "In Love" and "Still in Love". (Jamie Halliday, the founder of Audio Antihero, named the former as his "favourite song of all time".) On June 28, 2002, Shatner appeared with Brian Evans at the San Carlos Institute Theatre in Key West, Florida and duetted with him in the songs "What Kind of Fool Am I" and "The Lady Is a Tramp": the concert was later released as the album Brian Evans Live with Special Guest: William Shatner. In 2005, he was heard in the track "'64 - Go" on the Lemon Jelly album '64 - '95. And he provided the lead vocals on the progressive rock artist Ben Craven's track "Spy In The Sky Part 3" in Craven's album Last Chance To Hear, released in March 2016. Among the music videos for other artists that featured him were one for Ben Folds's "Landed", in which he played the part of a producer, and two for Brad Paisley, one promoting "Celebrity" and the other "Online", with the latter containing a meta-reference in which Shatner appeared to be heartbroken when told that he could not sing.

Performances of songs on television and in films 
Television audiences were introduced to Shatner's unorthodox musicianship not long after Star Trek had made him famous. In 1978, while hosting the fifth presentation of Saturn Awards bestowed by the Academy of Science Fiction, Fantasy and Horror Films, he performed a version of Elton John's Rocket Man that went on to become a staple of comedic parody. In an episode of Dinah Shore's talk show, Dinah!, he used his appearance on it to perform Harry Chapin's "Taxi". On June 9, 2005, he contributed his version of "My Way" to the presentation of George Lucas's AFI Life Achievement Award, backed by a chorus line of dancers in Imperial Stormtrooper costumes who ended Shatner's segment by picking him up and carrying him offstage. On December 11, 2005, he launched Comedy Central's Last Laugh 2005 with a skit in which he appeared as a Lucifer celebrating how well the year had gone from the point of view of Hell. On March 29, 2006, TV Land aired a Shatner-centred episode of their Living in TV Land series subtitled "William Shatner in Concert". The program featured footage of him working with Ben Folds on Has Been, and included a sequence in which he performed with Folds's band and Joe Jackson; it climaxed with a defiant rendition of "Lucy in the Sky with Diamonds" that was punctuated by him giving the finger. To promote his Biography Channel talk show Shatner's Raw Nerve, he guest-hosted World Wrestling Entertainment's flagship show WWE Raw on February 1, 2010, and performed several wrestlers' entrance theme songs. In the fourth episode of his sitcom $♯*! My Dad Says, his character, Ed Goodson, delivered a Shatner-style Karaoke treatment of Right Said Fred's "I'm Too Sexy". In the same scene, a waitress asked Ed if he wanted to tackle "Rocket Man" and he answered "Not tonight!". On November 4, during a television appearance on the Lopez Tonight show, he performed a cover of Cee Lo Green's song "F**k You".

Several of the movies in which Shatner participated featured him in a musical context. In the closing scene of Free Enterprise, he recited an oration of Mark Antony's from Julius Caesar over a rap delivered by The Rated R, a duet listed in the movie's credits as "No Tears for Caesar". In Miss Congeniality, he performed the song "Miss United States", which was included in the movie's soundtrack album. He contributed the voice of Buzz Lightyear to the Star Command anthem "To Infinity And Beyond"  in the 2000 film Buzz Lightyear of Star Command: The Adventure Begins.

In 2007, one of Shatner's albums, Has Been, was taken up by the writer and choreographer Margo Sappington (notable for her work on Oh! Calcutta!) as the basis for a dance project, Common People, created for the Milwaukee Ballet. Shatner attended the premiere of the work and arranged for it to be filmed. The resulting feature documentary, William Shatner's Gonzo Ballet, was favourably received when it was unveiled at the Nashville Film Festival on April 17, 2009.

In addition to treating songs with apparently serious intent, Shatner has sometimes offered performances which, like many passages from his memoirs, are exercises in self-mockery. Instances include his versions of the five nominees in the Best Song from a Movie category at the 1992 MTV Movie Awards. He also mined this vein of self-deprecating comedy as the lynchpin of Priceline's television advertising campaign. In one commercial for the company, he joined with his frequent collaborator Ben Folds in an ironic version of the Diana Ross hit "Do You Know Where You're Going To?".

Space career

Space Shuttle Discovery 
Ever since its Apollo 15 lunar mission, NASA has woken up its astronauts with specially tailored recordings. On March 7, 2011, the crew of STS-133 on the Space Shuttle Discovery began their last day docked to the International Space Station with Alexander Courage's title theme for Star Trek and Shatner reciting an adapted version of the show's famous introduction: "Space, the final frontier. These have been the voyages of the Space Shuttle Discovery. Her 30-year mission: To seek out new science. To build new outposts. To bring nations together on the final frontier. To boldly go, and do, what no spacecraft has done before."

2021 spaceflight 
Shatner took part in Blue Origin's second sub-orbital human spaceflight, Blue Origin NS-18, on October 13, 2021. Invited to join Chris Boshuizen, Glen de Vries and Audrey Powers on the trip by Blue Origin's creator, the entrepreneur and Trekkie Jeff Bezos, he began his real-world visit to space at Blue Origin's Launch Site One in West Texas, travelling on the RSS First Step, a New Shepard suborbital rocket capsule. Aged 90 years, 6 months and 22 days, he became the oldest person to fly into space, surpassing Wally Funk, who had flown on Blue Origin's first crewed spaceflight at the age of 82 in July 2021. In a televised post-flight conversation with Bezos, Shatner articulated experiencing the overview effect, a deepened understanding of the fact that the ecosphere of the Earth is but a thin, fragile skin enveloping its planet.

Personal life

Shatner dislikes watching himself perform. He says that there are episodes of the original Star Trek television show that he has never seen, and he is just as averse to watching his performance in Boston Legal. He has claimed that the only Star Trek movie that he has screened is the one that he directed and so necessarily viewed when it was being edited, Star Trek V: The Final Frontier, although in his 1993 book Star Trek Memories, he recalls how disappointed he felt when he attended the premiere of the first Star Trek movie, Robert Wise's Star Trek: The Motion Picture.

Shatner is a longtime U.S. resident and has a green card.

Family
Shatner has been married four times. His first wife was a Canadian actress, Gloria Rand (née Rabinowitz), whom he married on August 12, 1956. The couple had three daughters: Leslie (born in 1958), Lisabeth (born in 1961) and Melanie (born in 1964). Shatner left Rand while acting in Star Trek: The Original Series, after which he divorced her in March 1969.

Shatner's second wife was Marcy Lafferty, the daughter of the television producer Perry Lafferty. Lasting from 1973 to 1996, their marriage was Shatner's longest, but did not produce any children.

Shatner's third wife was Nerine Kidd, whom he married in 1997. Returning home at around 10 p.m. on August 9, 1999, he found her lying lifeless at the bottom of their backyard swimming pool. She was forty years old. Once an autopsy had revealed that her blood contained both alcohol and diazepam, the coroner decided that the cause of her death was accidental drowning and the Los Angeles Police Department, agreeing that there was no evidence of foul play, closed its file on the case. Speaking to the press shortly after his wife's death while visibly still in a state of shock, Shatner said that she had "meant everything" to him and described her as his "beautiful soulmate". He urged the public to support Friendly House, a non-profit organization that helps women to rebuild their lives after trying to free themselves from alcoholism or other forms of drug addiction. He later told Larry King in an interview that "my wife, whom I loved dearly, and who loved me, was suffering with a disease that we don't like to talk about: alcoholism. And she met a tragic ending because of it."

In his 2008 book Up Till Now: The Autobiography, Shatner disclosed how Leonard Nimoy, himself no stranger to alcoholism, had done his best to try to avert the tragedy that Kidd's affliction threatened:

In 2000, a Reuters story reported that Shatner was planning to write and direct The Shiva Club, a dark comedy about the grieving process inspired by his wife's death. Shatner's 2004 album Has Been included a spoken word piece, "What Have You Done", that describes his anguish upon discovering Nerine's body.

In 2001, Shatner married Elizabeth Anderson Martin. In 2004, she co-wrote the song "Together" on Shatner's album Has Been. Shatner filed for divorce from Elizabeth in 2019. The divorce was finalized in January 2020.

Relationships with other actors
Shatner first appeared on screen with Leonard Nimoy in 1964 when both actors guest-starred in an episode of The Man from U.N.C.L.E., "The Project Strigas Affair". Much like their characters on Star Trek, Shatner and Nimoy had a professional rivalry that developed into a close friendship. After the show's cancellation in 1969, they reunited in Star Trek: The Animated Series, and they also worked together on both The $20,000 Pyramid and T. J. Hooker. In 2016, Shatner revealed that despite their long and affectionate relationship, he and Nimoy had not spoken to each other in the five years before his death the year before.

Nimoy spoke about their mutual rivalry during the Star Trek years:

On an episode of the A&E series Biography, where it was also divulged that Nimoy was Shatner's best man at his wedding with his fourth wife Elizabeth, Nimoy said, "Bill Shatner hogging the stage? No. Not the Bill Shatner I know." When Nimoy died in 2015, Shatner said, "I loved him like a brother. We will all miss his humor, his talent, and his capacity to love." Although Shatner was unable to take part in Nimoy's funeral due to other commitments, his daughters attended in his place, and he celebrated his friend's life in an online memorial.

Shatner has been friends with actress Heather Locklear since 1982, when she began co-starring with him on T. J. Hooker. As she  combined her work on Hooker with a semi-regular role in Dynasty—also an Aaron Spelling production—she was asked by Entertainment Tonight whether she was finding her schedule difficult. She said that working with both Shatner and her experienced colleagues on Dynasty could be daunting, but that her nervousness motivated her to turn up on set well prepared. After T.J. Hooker ended, Shatner helped her to get other roles, and after Nerine Shatner's death in 1999, she was solicitous in comforting him in his bereavement. They worked together again in 2005, when she appeared in two episodes of Boston Legal as Kelly Nolan, a woman being tried for killing her much older, wealthy husband. The episodes' story involves Shatner's character becoming attracted to Nolan and trying to insert himself into her defence. Asked how she came to be cast in the series, Locklear said, "I love the show. It's my favorite show, and I sorta kind of said, 'Shouldn't I be William Shatner's illegitimate daughter, or his love interest?'"

For years, some of Shatner's Star Trek co-stars accused him of being difficult to work with, particularly George Takei, Walter Koenig, and James Doohan. Shatner acknowledged the resentment that Koenig and Doohan felt towards him in Star Trek Movie Memories, and Takei wrote about his issues with Shatner in his 2004 memoir, To the Stars.

Interviewed in London in 2023, Takei made it clear that the passage of time had done nothing to assuage his hostility towards his former colleague: "Shatner is a cantankerous old fossil. All of us have had problems with him.... There is this fiction that Bill and Leonard [Nimoy] were good friends, but we know better—Leonard privately expressed his irritation with Bill. Bill is an egocentric, self-involved prima donna." Koenig, on the other hand, accepted Shatner's invitation to appear on his interview series Shatner's Raw  Nerve in 2011 and made it clear that the animosity that he had once felt towards Shatner had long since dissipated. Doohan too achieved a warmer relationship with Shatner eventually, although it took a long time for the two men to build a rapport. In the 1990s, Shatner made numerous attempts to reconcile with Doohan without success; Doohan was the only former Star Trek co-star who declined to be interviewed by Shatner for his first, 1993 memoir, Star Trek Memories. But Doohan did contribute to Shatner's sequel, and an Associated Press article published at the time of Doohan's final convention appearance in August 2004, when he was already suffering from severe health problems, reported that he had forgiven Shatner and that the two actors had achieved the friendship as seniors that had eluded them in their youth. Sky Conway, the organizer of the penultimate convention attended by Doohan, was a witness to their burying the hatchet: "At our show: 'The Great Bird of the Galaxy' in El Paso, Texas in November 2003, a celebration of Gene Roddenberry and Star Trek, Bill and Jimmy went on stage together. Behind the scenes and before they went on stage, they hugged each other, apologized and expressed their love and admiration for each other. Bill specifically asked me to get them together so he could make amends and clear the air between the two of them before it was too late."

Health
Shatner began suffering from tinnitus, a hearing disorder, in the early 1990s. Researchers think that tinnitus can be triggered by exposure to very loud noise, and Shatner believes that his falling prey to it might be the result of a pyrotechnical accident that happened during the shooting of the 1967 Star Trek episode "Arena". His condition has been ameliorated by habituation therapy that involved his wearing an earpiece delivering low-level white noise which "helped his brain put the tinnitus in the background". He is a supporter of a tinnitus charity, the American Tinnitus Association.

Shatner revealed in 2020 that he suffers from swollen joints and various age-related "aches and pains". He treats his discomfort with cannabidiol oil, a dietary supplement extracted from cannabis.

Work with horses

In his spare time, Shatner enjoys breeding and showing American Saddlebreds and Quarter Horses. He rode one of his own mares, Great Belles of Fire, in Star Trek Generations. He has a  farm near Versailles, Kentucky, named Belle Reve Farm (from the French beau rêve, "Beautiful Dream"Belle Reve was the name of Blanche Dubois' and her sister Stella's family home in A Streetcar Named Desire), where he raises American Saddlebreds. Three of his notable horses are Call Me Ringo, Revival, and Sultan's Great Day.

In 2018, Shatner was awarded the National Reining Horse Association Lifetime Achievement Award in the National Reining Horse Association Hall of Fame. In 2019, he won a world championship with his Standardbred road horse Track Star while showing at the Kentucky State Fair World's Championship Horse Show in Louisville.

Philanthropy
Shatner participates in the Hollywood Home Games of the World Poker Tour, in which celebrities try to win money for their favourite charities. But most of his philanthropic work is associated with his love of horses. Since 1990, he has been one of the most important supporters of the Hollywood Charity Horse Show, which raises money for organizations serving children, and his horse farm works with the Central Kentucky Riding for Hope "Horses for Heroes" program.

In 2006, Shatner sold a kidney stone that had been surgically extracted from him to the online auction company GoldenPalace.com for $25,000, after rejecting an earlier bid of $15,000 with the observation that collectors had paid more than $100,000 for one of his Star Trek tunics. In an appearance on The View on May 16, 2006, he said that the proceeds of the sale and an additional $20,000 raised from the cast and crew of Boston Legal had been donated to the housing charity Habitat for Humanity.

Public appearances
On New Year's Day 1994, Shatner was the Grand Marshal of the Tournament of Roses Parade in Pasadena, California. Instead of leading the event in the customary classic car, he presided over it from horseback. He also took part in the coin toss before the subsequent 80th Rose Bowl college football game. (The teams vying for Rose Bowl honours that year were the University of Wisconsin Badgers and the University of California Los Angeles Bruins; the Badgers beat the Bruins by 21–16.) Twenty years later, he discharged the duties of a Grand Marshal again at an event in his native Canada, the 102nd Calgary Stampede.

Many of Shatner's public appearances reflect Captain Kirk's status as one of science fiction's best known icons. In September 2016, for example, the organizers of the Salt Lake Comic Con invited him to attend their event as their special guest. In 2017, he acted as the honorary captain of a ship hosting "Star Trek: The Cruise", the first Star Trek cruise that CBS Productions licensed, an event celebrating the 50th anniversary of the first broadcast of Star Treks original pilot episode. Shatner was dismayed that the cruise offered its customers an opportunity to swim with dolphins, and petitioned the CEO of the Norwegian Cruise Line through PETA not to include dolphins in the programme of their 2018 cruise: "The exploitation of any species for profit and entertainment would have violated the Prime Directive." Among the many other Kirk-related  dates in his diary were visits to the replica Star Trek: The Original Series set built by James Cawley in Ticonderoga, New York, which saw him guiding small groups of Trekkies on tours of Cawley's version of the Enterprise,
and a December 4, 2022 star guest beam-down to the L.A. Comic Con.

Filmography

Shatner has starred in movies and television shows for seven decades. He has also appeared in video games, primarily as James T. Kirk, as well as a number of commercials.

Awards and honoursEntertainment Two-time Saturn Award winner
 1980 Life Career Award
 1983 Best Actor (Star Trek II: The Wrath of Khan)
 Two-time Emmy Award winner
 2004 Outstanding Guest Actor in a Drama Series (The Practice)
 2005 Outstanding Supporting Actor in A Drama Series (Boston Legal)
 2005 Golden Globe Award
 2009 Prism Award
 2009 Streamy Award – Best Reality Web Series
 2015 Voice Arts Icon AwardEquestrian Multiple time World Champion breeder
 1985 American Saddlebred Horse Association (ASHA) Meritorious Service Award
 2017 National Reining Horse Association Dale Wilkinson Lifetime Achievement Award
 2021 ASHA C.J Cronan Sportsmanship AwardNational 2011 Governor General's Performing Arts Award
 2019 Appointed an Officer of the Order of Canada by Canadian Governor General Julie PayetteOrganizational 2014 NASA Distinguished Public Service Medal – highest award NASA gives a non-government employeeHalls of Fame 1983 Star on the Hollywood Walk of Fame
 1995 ASHA Breeders Hall of Fame
 2000 Star on Canada's Walk of Fame
 2006 Television Hall of Fame
 2020 WWE Hall of Fame – Celebrity Wing inducteeHonorary Degrees 2011 Honorary Doctorate of Letters from McGill UniversityMock/Satirical'''
 Two-time Golden Raspberry Award winner
 1989 Worst Actor (Star Trek V: The Final Frontier)
 1989 Worst Director (Star Trek V: The Final Frontier)

Bibliography
Fiction
 The TekWar series, co-written with Ron Goulart
 TekWar (1989) 
 TekLords (1991) 
 TekLab (1991) 
 Tek Vengeance (1993) 
 Tek Secret (1993) 
 Tek Power (1994) 
 Tek Money (1995) 
 Tek Kill (1996) 
 Tek Net (1997) 
 Star Trek series, with Judith and Garfield Reeves-Stevens
 Star Trek: The Ashes of Eden, 1995, 
 Star Trek: The Return, 1996, 
 Star Trek: Avenger, 1997, 
 Star Trek: Spectre, 1998, 
 Star Trek: Dark Victory, 1999, 
 Star Trek: Preserver, 2000, 
 Star Trek: Captain's Peril, 2002, 
 Star Trek: Captain's Blood, 2003, 
 Star Trek: Captain's Glory, 2006, 
 Star Trek: The AcademyCollision Course, 2007 
 War series
 Man o' War, 1996, 
 The Law of War, 1998, 
 Quest for Tomorrow series
 Delta Search, 1997, 
 In Alien Hands, 1997, 
 Step into Chaos, 1999, 
 Beyond the Stars, 2000, 
 Shadow Planet, 2002, 
 Believe (with Michael Tobias), 1992, 
 Comic book adaptations
 William Shatner's TekWorld (129 pages, February 1994)
 Star Trek: The Ashes of Eden, DC Comics graphic novel, 1995, 
 Samuel Lord Series
 Zero-G: Book 1, with Jeff Rovin, 2016, 
 Zero-G: Green Space , with Jeff Rovin, 2017, 

Non-fiction
 Captain's Log: William Shatner's Personal Account of the Making of "Star Trek V: The Final Frontier", as told by Lisabeth Shatner, 1989, 
 Star Trek Memories, with Chris Kreski, 1993, 
 Star Trek Movie Memories, with Chris Kreski, 1994, 
 Get a Life!, with Chris Kreski, 1999, 
 Star Trek: I'm Working on That: A Trek from Science Fiction to Science Fact, with Chip Walter, 2002, 
 Up Till Now: The Autobiography, with David Fisher, 2008, 
 Shatner Rules, with Chris Regan, 2011, 
 Leonard: My Fifty-Year Friendship with a Remarkable Man, with David Fisher, 2016, 
 Spirit of the Horse: A Celebration in Fact and Fable, with Jeff Rovin, 2017, 
 Live long And ... : What I Might Have Learned Along the Way, with David Fisher, 2018, 
 Boldly Go: Reflections on a Life of Awe and Wonder, with Joshua Brandon, 2022, 

 Audiobooks 
 2008: Up Till Now – with David Fisher – (read by William Shatner), Highroads Media, 
 2011: Shatner Rules – with Chris Regan – (read by William Shatner), Penguin Audio, 
 2016: Leonard: My Fifty-Year Friendship with a Remarkable Man – with David Fisher – (read by William Shatner), Macmillan Audio, 
 2018: Live Long And …: What I Learned Along the Way – with David Fisher – (read by William Shatner), Macmillan Audio, 
 2022: Boldly Go: Reflections on a Life of Awe and Wonder – with Joshua Brandon – (read by William Shatner), Simon & Schuster Audio, 

 Discography 
 The Transformed Man (1968) – Decca Records
 William Shatner Live (1977) – live double album – Lemli Records (reissued the following year by Imperial House as Captain of the Starship – William Shatner Live!)
 Spaced Out: The Very Best of Leonard Nimoy & William Shatner (1996) – compilation album – Universal (Includes 7 tracks from The Transformed Man + 17 tracks by Leonard Nimoy)
 Has Been (2004) – produced and arranged by Ben Folds – guest artists include Folds, Joe Jackson, Aimee Mann, Lemon Jelly, Henry Rollins, Adrian Belew, and Brad Paisley – Shout! Factory
 Exodus: An Oratorio in Three Parts (2008) – JMG/Jewish Music
 Seeking Major Tom (2011) – Cleopatra Records
 Ponder the Mystery (2013) with Billy Sherwood – Cleopatra Records
 Why Not Me (2018) with Jeff Cook – Heartland Records Nashville
 Shatner Claus (2018) – with Iggy Pop, Brad Paisley and Judy Collins – Cleopatra Records
 The Blues (2020) – with Brad Paisley, Kirk Fletcher, Sonny Landreth, Canned Heat – Cleopatra Records
 Bill (2021) – Produced and arranged by Daniel Miller. - guest artists include Brad Paisley, Joe Walsh, Robert Randolph, John Lurie, Joan as Police Woman and Dave Koz -  Republic Records.

References

Further reading
 "William Shatner and the Fromage Frontier", eight-page interview by Claire Connors, seven photos including cover by Jeff Lipsky. Cheese Connoisseur'', summer 2013, cover story, pages 26–33. Published by Phoenix Media Network, Inc., Boca Raton, Florida. Shatner discusses his career, health, current and future projects, and, especially, his appreciation of cheese.

External links

 
 
 
 
 
 
 
 William Shatner interview about Star Trek IV: The Voyage Home in 1986 by Texas Archive of the Moving Image

 
1931 births
Living people
20th-century Canadian Jews
20th-century Canadian male actors
20th-century Canadian male singers
20th-century Canadian male writers
20th-century Canadian novelists
21st-century Canadian Jews
21st-century Canadian male actors
21st-century Canadian male singers
21st-century Canadian male writers
21st-century Canadian novelists
Anglophone Quebec people
Audiobook narrators
Best Supporting Actor Golden Globe (television) winners
Canadian Ashkenazi Jews
Canadian bloggers
Canadian emigrants to the United States
Canadian expatriate male actors in the United States
Film producers from Quebec
Canadian game show hosts
Canadian male equestrians
Canadian male film actors
Canadian male karateka
Canadian male novelists
Canadian male screenwriters
Canadian male Shakespearean actors
Canadian male television actors
Canadian male voice actors
Canadian people of Austrian-Jewish descent
Canadian people of Hungarian-Jewish descent
Canadian people of Jewish descent
Canadian people of Polish-Jewish descent
Canadian people of Ukrainian-Jewish descent
Canadian philanthropists
Canadian science fiction writers
Canadian Screen Award winners
Canadian television producers
Space tourists
Film directors from Montreal
Governor General's Performing Arts Award winners
Jewish Canadian filmmakers
Jewish Canadian male actors
Jewish Canadian musicians
Jewish Canadian writers
Jewish singers
Male actors from Montreal
Male bloggers
McGill University Faculty of Management alumni
New Shepard passengers
Officers of the Order of Canada
Outsider musicians
People from Côte Saint-Luc
People from Versailles, Kentucky
People from Westmount, Quebec
People who have flown in suborbital spaceflight
Primetime Emmy Award winners
Theatre World Award winners
Writers from Montreal
WWE Hall of Fame inductees